Silas Owens Sr. (1907 – April 4, 1960) was a mason and builder in Arkansas.

Childhood
Born in Faulkner County in 1907, Owens was one of six sons of Haywood Owens. Owens, like many young boys at that time, worked on the family farm, picking and cultivating cotton. Haywood also would let his sons watch construction work, which Silas took in awe. Owens then received training in carpentry and drafting from a local man; however, his skill in rockwork was largely self-taught. Shortly thereafter, Owens branched out and started contracting.

Works
His works include many listed on the National Register of Historic Places.

Works (credits) include:
Melvin Chrisco House, 237 Alvin Brown Rd., Damascus, AR (Owens, Silas Sr.) NRHP-listed
Church of Christ, AR 310, Guy, AR (Owens, Silas) NRHP-listed
Earl and Oza Crownover-Brown House, 133 S. Broadway, Damascus, AR (Owens, Silas Sr.) NRHP-listed
Eagle Guard Station, 11 mi. W of Townsend, Townsend, MT (Owens, Dick) NRHP-listed
Richard and Mettie Ealy House, 280 Solomon Grove Rd., Twin Groves, AR (Owens, Silas Sr.) NRHP-listed
First National Bank, 68 St. Francis St., Mobile, AL (Owens,Charles H.) NRHP-listed
Dennis and Christine Garrison House, 105 Garrison Rd., Greenbrier, AR (Owens, Silas Sr.) NRHP-listed
Charlie Hall House, 221 Old US 65, Twin Groves, AR (Owens, Silas Sr.) NRHP-listed
E.E. Hooten House, 400 AR 25 N, Guy, AR (Owens, Silas Sr.) NRHP-listed
Farris and Evelyn Langley House, 12 Langley Ln., Republican, AR (Owens, Silas Sr.) NRHP-listed
Lee Service Station, 28 South Broadway, Damascus, AR (Owens, Silas) NRHP-listed
Carl and Esther Lee House, 17493 US 65S, Damascus, AR (Owens, Silas Sr.) NRHP-listed
Mallettown United Methodist Church, 274 Mallett Town Rd., Mallet Town, AR (Owens, Silas Sr.) NRHP-listed
Merritt House, 139 N. Broadview, Greenbrier, AR (Owens, Silas Sr.) NRHP-listed
S.D. Merritt House, 45 AR 25 N, Greenbrier, AR (Owens, Silas Sr.) NRHP-listed
Mt. Zion Missionary Baptist Church, 249 AR 107, Enola, AR (Owens, Silas Sr., rock mason) NRHP-listed
Silas Owens Sr. House, 157 Solomon Grove Rd., Twin Groves, AR (Owens, Silas Sr.) NRHP-listed
Walter Patterson House, 1800 US 65N, Clinton, AR (Owens, Silas Sr.) NRHP-listed
Quattlebaum–Pelletier House, 43 Ozark, Twin Groves, AR (Owens, Silas Sr.) NRHP-listed
James and Jewell Salter House, 159 S. Broadview, Greenbrier, AR (Owens, Silas Sr.) NRHP-listed
Sellers House, 89 Acklin Gap Rd., Conway, AR (Owens, Silas Sr.) NRHP-listed
Solomon Grove Smith-Hughes Building, S of Co. Rd. 29, Twin Groves, AR (Owens, Silas Sr.) NRHP-listed
Spears House, 1235 AR 65 N, Greenbrier, AR (Owens, Silas) NRHP-listed
Terminal Warehouse, 211 E. Pleasant St., Baltimore, MD (Owens,Benjamin B.) NRHP-listed
Tyler–Southerland House, 36 Southerland, Conway, AR (Owens, Silas Sr.) NRHP-listed
Earl and Mildred Ward House, 1157 Mitchell St., Conway, AR (Owens, Silas Sr.) NRHP-listed
Washburn House, 40 Battles Loop, Guy, AR (Owens, Silas Sr.) NRHP-listed
Joe and Nina Webb House, 2945 Prince, Conway, AR (Owens, Silas Sr.) formerly NRHP-listed
One or more works in Castleberry–Harrington Historic District, Castleberry Rd., Republican, AR (Owens, Silas Sr.) NRHP-listed

References

American bricklayers
American architects
Architects from Arkansas
1960 deaths
1907 births
Date of birth missing
People from Faulkner County, Arkansas